Patrick Hull (born June 8, 1966) is an American entrepreneur based in Richmond, Virginia. He is known for founding Getloaded.com. He has revolutionized the logistics with the freight matching service for long-haul truck drivers.

Career
According to the Richmond Times-Dispatch, Hull was adopted at birth by John and Marianne Hull. In 1980, he started Cayman Inc while he was studying construction management at Virginia Tech. In 2009, he founded The Hull Foundation, which distributed gifts and stuffs to various humanitarian causes. Later in 2010, he founded Richmond Unite, which supported dozens of charities. In December, 2012 he joined as a contributor at Forbes.

In 2008, Getloaded.com was selected to participate in Virginia's VALET Program.

Institutional positions
 CEO at Phull Holdings
 Founder of Richmond Unite
 Founder of ScoopMonkey

References

External links
 

1966 births
Living people
Businesspeople from Louisville, Kentucky
Businesspeople from Richmond, Virginia